Gerardo "Jerry" Velez (born August 15, 1947) is an American musician. Best known for performing with American psychedelic rock musician Jimi Hendrix at Woodstock Festival in August 1969, Velez is a veteran percussionist and drummer, who has performed with many artists covering a number of different genres of music. He is also a common member of jazz fusion band Spyro Gyra.

Life and career
Velez began his musical career in The Bronx, New York. He notably joined Jimi Hendrix's band Gypsy Sun and Rainbows in July 1969, performed at the Woodstock Festival and at a small number of studio sessions, before Hendrix disbanded the group in favour of returning to the three-piece format of The Jimi Hendrix Experience. The band's performance at Woodstock was released on the live album Woodstock in 1994, followed by live album and video Live at Woodstock in 1999. For all Hendrix releases on which he appears, Velez was credited with the nickname Jerry.

Since performing with Jimi Hendrix, Velez has continued to record and tour with high-profile artists, including David Bowie, Elton John and Duran Duran. According to his official website, Gerardo Velez has been nominated for seven Grammy Awards.

Selected discography
with Jimi Hendrix
Live at Woodstock (1969) – percussion
with Chic
Live at the Budokan (1996) – percussion
with Christine Hayley
Gone Fishin''' (2002) – percussion
with Martha VelézHypnotized  (1972) – conga
with Spyro GyraMorning Dance (1979) – percussion, bongos, congaCatching the Sun (1980) – percussionCarnaval (1980) – percussion, bongosIncognito (1982) – percussionCity Kids (1983) – percussionAccess All Areas (1983) – percussionAlternating Currents (1985) – percussionDown the Wire (2009) – percussion
with David BowieBlack Tie White Noise'' (1993) – percussion

References

External links

1947 births
Living people
Musicians from the Bronx
Puerto Rican hip hop musicians
Puerto Rican jazz musicians
Puerto Rican rock musicians
Jazz musicians from New York (state)
Gypsy Sun and Rainbows members
Spyro Gyra members